Kevin Timothy Frazier (born May 20, 1964) is an American television host, widely known as co-host of Entertainment Tonight and the founder and owner of the urban entertainment website HipHollywood.com.

Career
Frazier was the first to host both Dan Patrick studios on the East and West coasts. He has worked as an anchor at Fox 19 in Cincinnati, as play-by-play commentator for the University of Cincinnati Bearcats basketball team from 1993 to 1995, and as Fox Sports Net, later ESPN, where he hosted SportsCenter and a multitude of National Basketball Association themed programming (including NBA Shootaround, NBA Fastbreak and NBA Fastbreak Tuesday). From 2004 to 2011, he was a correspondent for Entertainment Tonight as well as a fill-in host, and from 2011 to 2014, was a co-host of The Insider. Frazier is also the host of Game Changers on the weekly CBS Dream Team.

He made guest appearances on America's Next Top Model, Flavor of Love Girls: Charm School and Hell's Kitchen. Frazier is also a forum guest on Jim Rome Is Burning.

He hosted "Breakfast at the Open" on the Tennis Channel along with Lindsay Davenport for the 2009 U.S. Open and acting as a tennis correspondent from the Los Angeles studio. He also appeared on American Idol.

He was added to Versus College Football Central studio staff in October 2010.

On January 10–12, 2011 Frazier filled in on "The Dan Patrick Show" for Dan Patrick who was working at the national championship Oregon vs. Auburn Football game.

On March 5, 2011, it was announced that he had been named co-anchor of The Insider, joining The Insider anchor Lara Spencer.

In 2008, Frazier founded HipHollywood.com, an online web site for urban entertainment news. The company is a content partner for ET Online and The Insider, and offers news, pop culture information, photos and interviews with celebrities in music, sports, television and film.

On September 1, 2011, Frazier was named the lead studio anchor for College Football on FX and Fox Sports Net and was paired with analyst Marcus Allen for the 2011 season.

In 2013, Frazier was signed on to host a game show pilot called The Money Pump based on an Israeli format, produced by ITV Studios America and Reshet TV for CBS where contestants compete against an enormous money pump for a chance at the $1,000,000 prize. The show was never aired at the time.

Personal life
Frazier attended Oakland Mills Middle and Hammond High in Columbia, Maryland. He went on to Morgan State University. Along with wife Yasmin Cader, they have two sons: Shane and Reece, and Tony from a previous relationship.

References

External links
 
 Kevin Frazier's bio onET Online

Tennis commentators
African-American television personalities
American infotainers
American television sports announcers
National Basketball Association broadcasters
1964 births
Living people
Place of birth missing (living people)
College football announcers
21st-century African-American people
20th-century African-American people